Chinaberry, also known as Williams-Converse House, is a house in Aiken, South Carolina that was built in 1824. It was listed on the National Register of Historic Places in 1982.

A skirmish in the Civil War occurred in the front yard of the property.

References

Houses on the National Register of Historic Places in South Carolina
Colonial Revival architecture in South Carolina
Houses completed in 1824
National Register of Historic Places in Aiken County, South Carolina
Houses in Aiken County, South Carolina
Buildings and structures in Aiken, South Carolina
1824 establishments in South Carolina